Maria Landi (15?? – 19 January 1599), was a Lady consort of Monaco by marriage to Ercole Grimaldi, Lord of Monaco.

Life
Maria was a daughter of Claudio Landi, Prince of Val di Taro, and Juana Fernández de Córdoba y Milá de Aragón. 

She married Grimaldi on 15 September 1595. The marriage was arranged through Ercole's good contacts at the Spanish court and gave him great prestige, as Maria was a descendant of the Royal House of Aragon through her mother, which made Ercole related to the king of Aragon.

Issue
She had three children:

 Giovanna Maria Grimaldi (29 September 1596 – December 1620), married Gian Giacomo Teodoro Trivulzio, Conte di Melzo, Principe di Musocco.
 Honoré II (Monaco, 24 December 1597 – Monaco, 10 January 1662) married Ippolita Trivulzio.
 Maria Claudia Grimaldi, Carmeline nun in Genoa (1 January 1599 – 1668).

References 

Year of birth unknown
1599 deaths
House of Grimaldi
Princesses of Monaco
Monegasque people of Italian descent